Eriyodu is a panchayat town located in Dindigul district of Madurai Region in the state of Tamil Nadu, India. It is a part of vedasandur legislative constituency and karur parliamentary constituency. Eriyodu is in the administrative district of Dindigul. Eriyodu is located in Dindigul next to Karur State Highway road (SH 74).

Eriyodu has a public library, an Electricity Board office, a post office, a police station, and a government hospital. Tamil Nadu Mercantile Bank, Canara Bank are the banks available in Eriyodu. There are ten dependent villages scattered around Eriyodu.

Original Honey, The villagers surrounded Mango hills sell original honey without mixing any additional / artificial elements in it. Sometimes you can directly go with them to watch how they extract honey from honeycombs.

Geography

Mango Hills, a small hill which is located 6 km from Eriyodu. It is one of the best trekking spot during monsoon season. On the way to the hill you can spot lot of peacocks. occasionally people spotted fox and deer as well.

Eranasamuthiram pond is located in Southeast side of Eriyodu.

Climate
The climate is dry and hot, with rains from October to December. Temperatures during summer reach a maximum of 40 and a minimum of 25 degrees Celsius, while winter temperatures range between 25 and 18 degrees Celsius.

Eriyodu is the one of hottest place in Dindigul district.

Education

Eriyodu has two government schools and two private primary schools. One Government Arts and Science College is also there.

The government schools, which are more than 50 years old, are:
 Government Higher Secondary School
 Government Middle School

The private schools, which are more than 20 years old, are:
 Vani Nursery and Primary School
 Kalaivani Nursery and Primary School

Demographics

As of the 2001 India census, Eriyodu had a population of 7866. Males constitute 51% of the population and females 49%. Eriyodu has an average literacy rate of 66%, higher than the national average of 59.5%; male literacy is 76%, and female literacy is 55%. In Eriyodu, 11% of the population is under 6 years of age.

Politics
Eriyodu Assembly Constituency is part of Karur (Lok Sabha constituency).

Eriyodu is a part of Vedasandur legislative assembly constituency

Transportation
The nearest airport is at Madurai and the nearest major railway station is the Dindigul Railway Junction. 
Eriyodu's Railway station is last Station of Salem Railway division towards madurai.

Eriyodu is one of the mid point to connet highways of NH-44 (vedasandur) and NH-83 (Vadamadurai and Ayyalur). Both highways are connet major cities.

Nearest towns

For More Information

References 
 1) "Census of India 2001: Data from the 2001 Census, including cities, villages and towns (Provisional)". Census Commission of India. Archived from the original on 2004-06-16..

External links 
 1) Reference Site - Arulkumar
 2) Reference Site - Thiyagaraaj

Cities and towns in Dindigul district